Shaheed Ziaur Rahman Medical College is a government medical school in Bangladesh, established on 5 November 1992. It is located in Bogra town. It is affiliated with the Rajshahi Medical University.

It has a 5-year medical education course leading to an MBBS. One-year internship after graduation is compulsory for all graduates. The degree is recognised by the Bangladesh Medical and Dental Council

History
Shaheed Ziaur Rahman Medical College was established on 5 November 1992. At first, it was started as a medical college collaborating with Mohammad Ali Hospital, Bogra. In 2006, a brand new hospital and college campus was constructed on the outskirts of Bogra city, beside the Dhaka-Rangpur highway, named on the basis of Shaheed President Ziaur Rahman who was born at Bogra. On 31 August 2006, the new campus at Silimpur started its journey. Previously about 50 students could get the chance to study there through nationwide examination for admission to public medical colleges of the country every year. From 2005, the numbers increased to about 180.

See also
 List of medical colleges in Bangladesh

References

External links
 

Medical colleges in Bangladesh
Hospitals in Bangladesh
Educational institutions established in 1992
1992 establishments in Bangladesh
Organisations based in Bogra District